The Women's 400m Freestyle event at the 10th FINA World Aquatics Championships swam on 20 July 2003 in Barcelona, Spain. Preliminary heats swam during the day's morning session, with the top-8 finishers advancing to swim again in the Final during the evening session.

Prior to the event, the World (WR) and Championship (CR) records were:
WR: 4:03.85 swum by Janet Evans (USA) on September 22, 1988, in Seoul, South Korea
CR: 4:06.28 swum by Tracey Wickham (Australia) on August 24, 1978, in Berlin, Germany

Results

Final

Preliminaries

References

Swimming at the 2003 World Aquatics Championships
2003 in women's swimming